Lipsko is a town in Masovian Voivodeship, central Poland.

Lipsko may also refer to the following villages:
Lipsko, Lublin Voivodeship (east Poland)
Lipsko, Subcarpathian Voivodeship (south-east Poland)